The Avenger is a 1960 West German crime film directed by Karl Anton and starring Heinz Drache, Ingrid van Bergen and Ina Duscha. It is based on the 1926 novel The Avenger by Edgar Wallace. It was shot at the Bavaria Studios in Munich. The film's sets were designed by the art director Willi Herrmann.

Plot
A number of packaged disembodied heads have been in random areas of the English countryside. In each package is a letter to the police from the killer, who dubs himself "The Executioner." Each victim is seemingly unrelated to one another. When a Scotland Yard employee is killed, Detective Mike Brixan (Heinz Drache) of Special Branch is called in to investigate. The only clue is that a black, four-door sedan has been seen at the scene of the crime and that the typewriter that the letters have been written on have two offset letters.

When Ruth Sanders (Ina Duscha), the niece of the man killed and the last person to see him alive, is located as an extra working on location, Brixan discovers a page of a script that has been written on the same typewriter as the Executioner's letters. Consequently, Brixan believes that the Executioner is among the cast, crew, or parties involved in the film shoot.

Cast
 Heinz Drache as Michael Brixan
 Ingrid van Bergen as Stella Mendoza
 Benno Sterzenbach as Sir Gregory Penn
 Ina Duscha as Ruth Sanders
 Ludwig Linkmann as Henry Longvale
 Siegfried Schürenberg as Major Staines
 Klaus Kinski as Lorenz Voss
 Rainer Brandt as Reggie Conolly
 Friedrich Schoenfelder as Jack Jackson (as Friedrich Schönfelder)
 Al Hoosmann as Bhag (as Al Hoosman)
 Maria Litto as Malaiische Tänzerin
 Franz-Otto Krüger as Regie-Assistant Frankie
 Rainer Penkert as Camera Man
 Albert Bessler as News Hound

Reception
Author and film critic Leonard Maltin awarded the film two and a half out of four stars, calling it "[an] Above-par shocker". Dave Sindelar, on his website Fantastic Movie Musings and Ramblings gave the film a mixed review, criticizing the film's poor dubbing, and pacing. However, Sindelar also wrote, "Some of the other Edgar Wallace movies from this time feel the same way, and I sometimes wonder if the movie would fare better in subtitled form. Still, there is a sense of dark, morbid fun to the stories, and I suspect that some time in the future, another enterprising movie company will see the appeal of Wallace’s work and make their own series. And, you know, I wouldn’t mind that at all." TV Guide awarded the film a mixed two out of four stars, calling it "A charming mix of old dark house cliches and behind-the-scenes drama".

Release
The Avenger was released on August 5, 1960 in Frankfurt.

See also
 Klaus Kinski filmography

References

Bibliography
 Bergfelder, Tim. International Adventures: German Popular Cinema and European Co-Productions in the 1960s. Berghahn Books, 2005.

External links

1960 films
1960s mystery films
1960s crime thriller films
German mystery films
German crime thriller films
West German films
1960s German-language films
German black-and-white films
Films directed by Karl Anton
Films based on works by Edgar Wallace
Films based on British novels
Films shot in Munich
Films set in London
Films shot at Bavaria Studios
Films about filmmaking
1960s German films